Pushkar–Gayathri are an Indian filmmaking duo who primarily work in Tamil films. They are the only married couple directors in Asia.

Filmography

Awards

References 

Tamil film directors
Living people
Indian filmmaking duos
Year of birth missing (living people)
Film directors from Chennai
Loyola College, Chennai alumni
Northwestern University alumni
University of New Orleans alumni